Whitbeck may refer to:
Whitbeck, Cumbria, a village in Cumbria, England

People with the surname

Harris Whitbeck, CNN's International Correspondent based in Mexico City, Mexico
Harris Whitbeck Sr., upper-class Guatemalan businessman
John Whitbeck, American attorney and political official